Gordon Henry (born 21 June 1954) is a Canadian rower. He competed in two events at the 1988 Summer Olympics.

References

External links
 

1954 births
Living people
Canadian male rowers
Olympic rowers of Canada
Rowers at the 1988 Summer Olympics
People from Summerside, Prince Edward Island
Sportspeople from Prince Edward Island
20th-century Canadian people